The 2008 M&M Meat Shops Canadian Junior Curling Championships was held February 2–10 at the Soo Curlers Association and Tarentorous Curling Club in Sault Ste. Marie, Ontario. The winning teams represented Canada at the 2008 World Junior Curling Championships.

Men's

Teams

Standings

Results

Draw 1

Draw 2

Draw 3

Draw 4

Draw 5

Draw 6

Draw 7

Draw 8

Draw 9

Draw 10

Draw 11

Draw 12

Draw 13

Draw 14

Draw 15

Draw 16

Draw 17

Draw 18

Playoffs

Tiebreaker

Semi final

Final

Women's

Teams

Standings

Results

Draw 1

Draw 2

Draw 3

Draw 4

Draw 5

Draw 6

Draw 7

Draw 8

Draw 9

Draw 10

Draw 11

Draw 12

Draw 13

Draw 14

Draw 15

Draw 16

Draw 17

Draw 18

Playoffs

Tiebreaker #1

Tiebreaker #2

Semi final

Final

Qualification

Ontario
The Pepsi Ontario Junior Curling Championships were held January 2–6 at the Coldwater & District Curling Club in Coldwater.

Danielle Inglis of Burlington defeated Rachel Homan from the Ottawa Curling Club 5-4 in the women's final. To make it to the final, Homan had to win a tiebreaker match against Katie Morrissey of the Rideau Curling Club and then Hollie Nicol of Kitchener-Waterloo 6-5 in the semifinal.

In the men's final, Travis Fanset out of St. Thomas defeated Neil Sinclair of Manotick 9-8. Sinclair won his semifinal match against the Carleton Heights Curling Club's Christian Tolusso.

References

Jun
Sport in Sault Ste. Marie, Ontario
Curling in Northern Ontario
Canadian Junior Curling Championships
2008 in Ontario
February 2008 sports events in Canada